Alasdair Charles Monk (born 8 November 1972) is an English former footballer who played as a goalkeeper for Colchester United. He began his career at Everton and went onto play for Swedish club IFK Stromstad and later returned to England joining Norwich City.

Career

Born in Epsom, Monk began his career at Everton, from where he later joined Swedish club IFK Stromstad. He returned to England joining Norwich City, appearing for the reserve team. He was then brought in at Colchester United under Roy McDonough. He made first team appearances in a Colchester shirt during a 4–2 Associate Members Cup defeat to Barnet on 21 December 1992 at Underhill. He also appeared in a Conference Shield match on 6 October 1992 against Conference runners-up in the previous season Wycombe Wanderers. The game was an annual trophy held between the winner of the Conference and the FA Trophy, but as Colchester had completed the double, Wycombe were invited to face the U's. The match resulted in a 3–0 defeat.

References

1972 births
Living people
Sportspeople from Epsom
English footballers
Association football goalkeepers
Everton F.C. players
Norwich City F.C. players
Colchester United F.C. players